Renzo, the diminutive of Lorenzo, is an Italian masculine given name and a surname.

Given name 
Notable people named Renzo include the following:

Renzo Alverà (1933–2005), Italian bobsledder 
Renzo Arbore (born 1937), Italian TV host, showman, singer, musician, film actor, and film director
Renzo Barbieri (1940–2007), Italian author and editor of Italian comics
Renzo Caldara (born 1943), Italian bobsledder 
Renzo Cesana (1907–1970), Italian-American actor, writer, composer, and songwriter 
Renzo Cramerotti (born 1947), Italian male javelin thrower 
Renzo Dalmazzo (1886–?), Italian lieutenant general
Renzo De Felice (1929–1996), Italian historian
Renzo De Vecchi (1894–1967), Italian football player and coach
Renzo Fenci (1914–1999), Italian-American sculptor based in Southern California.
Renzo Furlan (born 1970), Italian tennis player
Renzo Fujiwara (born 1973), A minor character in the movie The End of Cygnus
Renzo Gobbo (born 1961), Italian association football manager and player
Renzo Gracie (born 1967), Brazilian mixed martial artist
Renzo Marangon (born 1955), Italian politician
Renzo Montagnani (1930–1997), Italian film and theatre actor and dubber
Renzo Morigi (1895–1962), Italian pistol sports shooter 
Renzo Novatore (1890-1922), Italian individualist anarchist, Futurist, militant, philosopher and poet
Renzo Olivo (born 1992), Argentine tennis player
Renzo Palmer (1929–1988), Italian film, television and stage actor
Renzo Pasolini (1938–1973), Italian motorcycle road racer 
Renzo Piano (born 1937), Italian architect
Renzo Provinciali (1895–1981), Italian lawyer, anarchist, Futurist and journalist
Renzo Rabellino (born 1958), Italian politician
Renzo Reggiardo (born 1972), Peruvian politician
Renzo Revoredo (born 1986), Peruvian footballer 
Renzo Rossellini (1908–1982), Italian composer
Renzo Rossellini (born 1941), Italian film producer
Renzo Rosso (born 1955), Italian fashion entrepreneur
Renzo Sambo (1942–2009), Italian competition rower
Renzo Sheput (born 1980), Peruvian footballer
Renzo Spiteri (born ?), Maltese musician
Renzo Ulivieri (born 1941), Italian association football manager
Renzo Vecchiato (born 1955), Italian basketball player 
Renzo Vespignani (1924-2001), Italian painter, printmaker and illustrator
Renzo Yáñez (born 1980), Chilean footballer 
Renzo Zorzi (1946–2015), Italian racing driver

Surname 
Joe DeRenzo (born 1958), American jazz drummer, composer and producer
Patrizio Di Renzo (born 1971), Swiss photographer and director
Jordan Renzo, American actor

Fictional Characters 

 Samuel Renzo, from the video game TimeSplitters: Future Perfect
 Renzo Tramaglino, from the novel The Betrothed by Alessandro Manzoni (1785-1873)

Film 
 Renzo Gracie: Legacy, Brazilian film

Other uses 
 Landi Renzo, multinational company
 Renzo Gracie Academy,  martial arts school
 Stadio Renzo Barbera, Football stadium in Palermo, Italy

Italian masculine given names
Italian-language surnames